Robert Alan Wall (August 22, 1939 – January 30, 2022) was an American actor and martial artist.

Early life
Wall was born on August 22, 1939 in San Jose, California to Ray Wall, a construction worker and Reva (Wingo) Wall, a nurse. While in high school, he took up wrestling. Wall attended San Jose State University on a scholarship, and later moved to southern California.

Career

Training
Wall studied Okinawan martial arts under Gordon Doversola. In 1966, he, along with karate champion Joe Lewis, opened the Sherman Oaks Karate Studio in Sherman Oaks, California. In 1968,  Lewis sold his share of the studio to Chuck Norris. Robert Wall featured in a number of films, most notably three appearances with  Bruce Lee: the 1972 film The Way of the Dragon, as O'Hara in Enter the Dragon in 1973, and Game of Death (although he only appeared with Bruce’s stunt double), Bruce Lee's incomplete film re-cut in 1978. He has small roles in Norris films, such as Code of Silence (1985), Firewalker (1986), and Hero and the Terror (1988).

Wall studied several arts under many notable masters. They included Judo under Gene LeBell, Okinawan Shorin-Ryu under Joe Lewis, and Brazilian Jiu-Jitsu under the Machado Brothers.

Conflict with Steven Seagal
Wall was particularly famous for his public rivalry with Steven Seagal, which provoked a series of challenges between the two between 1988 and 1992. It started when Seagal made disparaging commentaries about Bruce Lee, Chuck Norris, and other American martial artists in interviews, culminating in two articles in the Black Belt magazine where he claimed he would fight to the death anybody who believed they could defeat him.

Indignant at Seagal's slights of Lee and American martial artists, as well as offended by his boasts, Wall gathered a group of martial artists willing to answer the challenge, who were nicknamed the "Dirty Dozen" in a reference to the 1967 war film The Dirty Dozen. The group included Benny Urquidez, Bill Wallace, Howard Jackson, Roger Carpenter, Allen Steen, Jim Harrison, Dennis Alexio, Richard Norton, Billy Robertson, Pat Burleson, and William "Blinky" Rodriguez, with Gene LeBell and Gerard Finot as potential members and Karyn Turner as a possible promoter for one or more matches.

The Dirty Dozen were controversial in the martial arts community, with some deriding them as an overreaction and a promotion of violence. LeBell later revealed the affair was hurting him professionally and forced him to withdraw, while Urquidez and Burleson became reportedly unhappy with the group's concept. However, several other members claimed to be content with the campaign alone, with Rodriguez declaring, "just by not accepting the challenge, Seagal tells us where he's at."

Other work
In 2009, Wall starred as a bodyguard in the film Blood and Bone.

Personal life and death
Wall was a 9th degree black belt under Chuck Norris and the co-founder and CEO of a martial arts organization known as World Black Belt Inc. In 1975, Wall authored the book Who's Who in the Martial Arts and Directory of Black Belts (Library of Congress Catalog Card No. 75-2280), the first book of its kind for martial artists.

He died in Los Angeles on January 30, 2022, at the age of 82.

Filmography

Films

References

External links

World Black Belt Inc.
 Bob Wall Interview at cityonfire.com
Robert Wall at Find a Grave

1939 births
2022 deaths
San Jose State University alumni
American chun kuk do practitioners
American male film actors
American male karateka
American tang soo do practitioners
Burials at Hollywood Forever Cemetery
Male actors from Los Angeles
Male actors from San Jose, California
Sportspeople from San Jose, California